The Ontario Khalsa Darbar, popularly referred to as Dixie Gurdwara, is a Sikh Gurdwara (place of worship)  in Mississauga, Ontario.  One of the few Sikh Gurdwara in Canada, it attracts hundreds of celebrants for major religious festivals. A gurdwara, meaning "the doorway to the Guru", is the Sikh place of worship and may be referred to as a Sikh temple.

History

It was officially started in 1978 in a small trailer. Steadily, more and more money was raised and land was purchased and a building was created in 1988.   Its new location is at 7080 Dixie Road, Mississauga, Ontario.  The opening ceremony in 1989 drew a crowd of 40.

During the 1990s more land was bought and an outdoor stadium was built. Hardial Dhir Architect was chosen to reconstruct and design the community centre and additions to the Gurdwara.  The Gurdwara is the central Gurdwara in the Greater Toronto Area.

In 1990, a school for teaching of Punjabi language and Sikh Studies was started in this Gurdwara. Eminent Sikh historian Dr Harjinder Singh Dilgeer acted as the Director of the project. A big library was also set up in the Gurdwara. Gurmat Training Camps for children were also organised in which hundreds of students participated. Later, sports activities too were introduced.

In the mid to late 1990s the old building was getting overcrowded so a 3 million dollar project was announced to build a large extension. Much money was raised, however the building still gets overcrowded on special days like Bandhi Chhor ("Release from Confinement", held according to Nanakshahi calendar on same date as Diwali) and Vaisakhi and New Year (December 31). In 2001 the Nagar Kirtan (which celebrates Viasakhi) had a crowd of nearly 120,000people.

In 2003 the Bandhi Chhor celebration drew in a crowd of over 112,000 people. A new plan in 2004 was announced to build a $2 million parking lot.

The temple has been the subject of several controversies such as a donation to the African National Congress in 1990, a dispute over whether Sikh marriages can be performed in a hotel which serves alcohol and meat, and when a Sikh priest stayed at the temple, thus defying a deportation order.

See also
Sikhism in Canada

References

External links
 Ontario Sikhs

Gurdwaras in Canada
Sikh places